Syngamia interrogata is a moth in the family Crambidae. It was described by Whalley in 1962. It is found on the Solomon Islands, where it has been recorded from Rennell Island.

References

Moths described in 1962
Spilomelinae
Moths of the Solomon islands